The women's super-G competition of the Sochi 2014 Olympics was held at the Rosa Khutor Alpine Resort near Krasnaya Polyana, Russia, on Saturday, 15 February. Anna Fenninger from Austria won the race, getting her first Olympic medal. Maria Höfl-Riesch of Germany won the silver medal, and Nicole Hosp of Austria finished third. Of the 2010 medalists, only Tina Maze participated and finished fifth.

Summary

Eighteen of the 49 competitors did not finish, including seven of the first eight racers on the course.

The gold medal awarded in this event featured a fragment from the Chelyabinsk meteor to commemorate the first anniversary of this meteor strike.

Results
The race was started at 11:00 local time, (UTC+4).

References

External links
FIS-Ski.com – 2014 Winter Olympics – Women's Super G
Results

Super-G